James Compton (born 1939) is president and CEO of the Chicago Urban League.

James Compton may also refer to:

James Compton, 3rd Earl of Northampton (1622–1681), English peer, soldier, and politician
James Compton, 5th Earl of Northampton (1687–1754), British peer and politician
James Compton (musician) (born 1959), British musician and actor